Bruce Schultz may refer to:

Bruce Schultz (bishop) (1932–2012), Bishop of Grafton
Bruce Schultz (footballer) (1913–1980), Australian rules footballer

See also
Bruce Scholtz (born 1958), American football player